Events in the year 2023 in Slovenia.

Incumbents
President: Nataša Pirc Musar
Prime Minister: Robert Golob

Events
 1 January – with Croatia's accession to the Schengen Area, border controls are abolished at 57 border crossings between the countries.
 16 January – Ministry of the Environment and Spatial Planning of the Republic of Slovenia grants a 20-year extension for operation of the Krško Nuclear Power Plant.
 22 February–5 March – Planica Nordic Centre hosts the 43rd edition of the FIS Nordic World Ski Championships.

Deaths

 1 January – Mako Sajko, documentarist, screenwriter and film director (born 1927).
 3 February - Bine Rogelj, ski jumper and caricaturist (born 1929).

References

 
2020s in Slovenia
Years of the 21st century in Slovenia
Slovenia
Slovenia